Malaya Murga is a rural locality (a village) in Kadnikov, Sokolsky District, Vologda Oblast, Russia. The population was 4 as of 2002.

Geography 
Malaya Murga is located 31 km northeast of Sokol (the district's administrative centre) by road. Bolshaya Murga is the nearest rural locality.

References 

Rural localities in Sokolsky District, Vologda Oblast